Kragehul I (DR 196 U) is a migration period lance-shaft found on Funen, Denmark. It is now in the collection of the National Museum of Denmark, Copenhagen, Denmark. The spear shaft was found in 1877 during the excavation of the classic war booty sacrificial site Kragehul on southern Funen. The site holds five deposits of military equipment from the period 200 to 475 AD. The spear shaft probably belongs to the latest deposit.

Inscription
The Elder Futhark inscription reads:
ek e=rila=z asugisalas m=uh=a h=aite g=ag=ag=a ginu g=ah=e … lija … hagala wiju big– …

The first part is normalized as:
ek erilaz āsugīsalas muha haitē, gagaga
Interpreted as "I, the erilaz of Āsugīsalaz, am called Muha, ga-ga-ga!", where "ga-ga-ga" may be some sort of ritual chant or battle cry. Āsugīsalaz is a Germanic compound name, consisting of ansu-, "god", and gīsalaz, "hostage". Muha also appears to be a personal name. The runes of gagaga are displayed as a row of three bindrunes based on the X-shape of the g-rune with sidetwigs attached to its extremities for the a. A similar sequence gægogæ is found on the Undley bracteate.

Interpretations
The gagaga and the remaining part of the inscriptions have prompted varying interpretations.

Schneider
Schneider (1969) opts for bull sacrifice, reading g-a as "gift, god!" and the remaining as
Ginugahelija Hagala wiju bi g[aia]. 
"the mighty roarer [the sacrificial bull], the Hagal, I dedicate to the spear".

Düwel
Düwel (1983) reads the thrice repeated g-a as  g[ibu] a[uja] "I give good fortune". For the second part of the inscription, he has
 ginu-ga he[lmat]lija ... hag?l(a) wi[g]ju bi g[aia].
"magical-"ga", the helmet-destroying hail I dedicate to the spear"

Pieper
Pieper (1999) reads g-a as g[ebu] a[nsu] "gift to the god [Odin]", with following
ginu-ga hellija hag?la wiju bi g[ebu].
"magical-god-gift, hellish hail I dedicate upon this gift"

MacLeod and Mees
MacLeod and Mees (2006) read gagaga as an onomatopoeia related to forms like the Undley bracteate's gægogæ, and read the expression as a metrical charm
gagaga ginu gahellija, hagala wiju bi g[aize].
"gagaga I yell resoundingly, hail I dedicate in the s[pear]"

See also
Æsir
Illerup Ådal
Roman Iron Age weapon deposits
Runic alphabet
Weapons sacrifice

Notes

References

 Düwel, Klaus, Runenkunde 2nd ed.,  Stuttgart 1983.
 MacLeod, Mindy, and Bernard Mees, Runic Amulets and Magic Objects, Woodbridge 2006.
 Pieper, Peter, "Fluchweihe" oder "Weihefluch": Imitative Kampfesmagie bei den Germanen nach dem Zeugnis von Runeninschriften in: Studien zur Sachsenforschung, 13, 1999, 303-324.
 Scandinavian Runic-text Database 2020, Department of Scandinavian Languages, Uppsala University.
 Schneider, Karl, Runische Inschriftenzeugnisse zum Stieropferkult der Angelsachsen in: Festschrift für Edgar Mertner, (hg.) Fabian, Bernhard, Suerbaum, Ulrich. München 1969, 9-54.

External links
runenprojekt.uni-kiel.de entry

Archaeological discoveries in Denmark
Elder Futhark inscriptions
Proto-Norse language